The Roman Catholic Diocese of Diébougou is a diocese located in the city of Diébougou in the Ecclesiastical province of Bobo-Dioulasso in Burkina Faso.

History
 18 October 1968: Established as Diocese of Diébougou from the then-Diocese of Bobo-Dioulasso
 30 November 2011: Territory is taken from the Diocese by Pope Benedict XVI to establish the newly erected Roman Catholic Diocese of Gaoua, which also becomes suffragan to the Archdiocese of Bobo-Dioulasso (the first Bishop-elect of the new Diocese is the Diocese of Diébougou's current Vicar General, Rev. Kambou Modeste)

Special churches
The cathedral is the Cathédrale Saint-Pierre et Saint-Paul in Diébougou.

Bishops
 Bishops of Diébougou (Roman rite), in reverse chronological order
 Bishop Der Raphaël Dabiré Kusiélé (since 3 April 2006)
 Bishop Jean-Baptiste Somé (18 October 1968  – 3 April 2006)

Other priests of this diocese who became bishops
Ollo Modeste Kambou, appointed Bishop of Gaoua in 2011
Laurent Birfuoré Dabiré, appointed Bishop of Dori in 2013

See also
Roman Catholicism in Burkina Faso

References

External links
 GCatholic.org

Diebougou
Christian organizations established in 1968
Roman Catholic dioceses and prelatures established in the 20th century
Diebougou, Roman Catholic Diocese of